Samaneh Chahkandi (born 28 March 1989) is an Iranian footballer who plays as a midfielder for Kowsar Women Football League club Bam Khatoon and the Iran women's national team.

International goals

References 

1989 births
Living people
Iranian women's footballers
Iran women's international footballers
Women's association football midfielders
Sportspeople from Mashhad